Uncle Hyacynth is a 1956 Spanish drama film directed by Ladislao Vajda. At the 6th Berlin International Film Festival, Pablito Calvo won the Golden Bear (Audience Award) for his interpretation in this film.

Cast
 Pablito Calvo - Pepote
 Antonio Vico - Jacinto
 José Marco Davó - Police inspector
 Juan Calvo - Second-hand-clothes dealer
 Mariano Azaña - Match seller 
 Pastora Peña - Stamp seller
 Julio Sanjuán - Organ grinder 
 Miguel Gila - Paco the con man
 Giulio Battiferri - Milkman
 José Isbert - Sánchez the watch forger
 Adriano Domínguez - Police officer
 Juan Calvo Domenech - Tailor
 Luis Sánchez Polack - Tailor's clerk
 Joaquín Portillo 'Top' - Paco's partner in swindle
 José María Lado
 Rafael Bardem - Art agent
 Paolo Stoppa - Art forger

References

External links

1956 films
1950s Spanish-language films
1956 drama films
Films directed by Ladislao Vajda
Spanish black-and-white films
1950s Spanish films
Spanish drama films